France  competed at the 2017 World Games in Wroclaw, Poland, from July 20, 2017 to July, 30 2017.

Competitors

Boules Sports
France  has qualified at the 2017 World Games:

Petanque Women's Singles Precision Shooting - 1 quota  
Lyonnaise Men's Singles Precision Shooting - 1 quota 
Lyonnaise Men's Singles Progressive Shooting - 1 quota

Gymnastic

Rhythmic Gymnastics
France has qualified at the 2017 World Games:

Women's individual event - 1 quota

Trampoline
Belarus has qualified at the 2017 World Games:

Men's Synchronized Trampoline - 1 quota 
Women's Individual Tumbling - 1 quota

Karate

France has qualified at the 2017 World Games:

Men's Kata - (Vu Duc Minh Dack)
Men's Kumite -60 kg (Sofiane Agoudjil)
Men's Kumite -67 kg (Steven Da Costa)
Women's Kata - (Sandy Scordo)
Women's Kumite -50 kg (Alexandra Recchia)
Women's Kumite -55 kg (Emily Thouy)
Women's Kumite -61 kg (Lucie Ignace)
Women's Kumite +68 kg (Anne-Laure Florentin)

Muay Thai

France has qualified at the 2017 World Games:

Men's -75kg - 1 quota place (Olivier Ngoto)

Sport Climbing
France has qualified at the 2017 World Games:

Women's Bouldering - Anouck Jaubert

References 

Nations at the 2017 World Games
2017 in French sport
2017